Redlands is a historic home located near Covesville, Albemarle County, Virginia. It was built between about 1798 and 1808, and is a rectangular two-story, five bay, brick structure covered by a hipped roof in the Federal style.  It features a Tuscan order front porch.  Its interior is notable for its fine Adamesque woodwork.  The master builder of the house was Martin Thacker, of neighboring Cedar Grove. It was built  for Robert Carter, grandson of John Carter, around the time of his marriage to Mary Eliza Coles of neighboring Enniscorthy.

It was added to the National Register of Historic Places in 1969.

References

External links
 Redlands, State Route 708, Charlottesville, Charlottesville, VA at the Historic American Buildings Survey (HABS)

Houses on the National Register of Historic Places in Virginia
Federal architecture in Virginia
Houses completed in 1808
Houses in Albemarle County, Virginia
National Register of Historic Places in Albemarle County, Virginia
Historic American Buildings Survey in Virginia
Individually listed contributing properties to historic districts on the National Register in Virginia